The Scroll of the Ancestors is a Mandaean religious text that describes the rituals of the Ṭabahata (ancestors') masiqta, held during the 5-day Parwanaya festival.

Manuscripts
Copies of the scroll include Manuscript 42 of the Drower Collection (DC 42), currently held at the Bodleian Library. The scroll was originally transcribed in 1743 and has 834 lines. It is similar to Prayer 170 of the Qolasta, but some names are different.

Ṭabahata Masiqta

The Ṭabahata Masiqta, or the "masiqta of the Parents", is held only once a year during the Parwanaya intercalary festival. Priests recite dozens of prayers, prepare 72 faṭiras (small, round, saltless, half-baked biscuits for ritual use) symbolizing ancestors, and also sacrifice a white dove, called ba, which symbolizes the spirit. According to the 1012 Questions, this masiqta cannot be held at any other time other than during the Parwanaya. For a more detailed description of the Ṭabahata Masiqta according to the Scroll of the Ancestors, see chapter 8 in Buckley (2002).

Below is the Qolasta prayer sequence (i.e., order of prayers to be recited) for the Ṭabahata Masiqta, following the numbering in Drower's 1959 Canonical Prayerbook. Some of the prayers involve fatiras that must be signed by a priest, who dips it with four fingers, tips pressed together, into sacramental masiqta oil and signs the fatira with oil three times, from left to right (similar in some ways to the sign of the cross). The masiqta has 3 parts. The first two parts are known as the "Mother Masiqta," while the final part is known as the "Father Masiqta."

See also
Tabahatan
List of Mandaean texts
Scroll of the Parwanaya

References

Mandaean texts
Mandaean rituals